Khalil Kalfat (November 26, 1942 – November 9, 2015) was an Egyptian author, political thinker and translator. He was born in Nubia, Aswan in Egypt.

References

External links
 Dictionary of Arabic Verb Conjugation
 A century of fantasy, review by Youssef Rakha of his translation of essays written by famous critics on Jorge Luis Borges, in Al Ahram Weekly.
 His health state 
 His sickness 
 His writings 

1942 births
2015 deaths
Egyptian writers
Egyptian people of Nubian descent
People from Aswan